The Wayne County Courthouse is located in Corydon, Iowa, United States. Three buildings have served Wayne County as its courthouse.

History
The first building was a two-story structure completed in 1856 for $600. Offices were located on the second floor and the courtroom was on the first floor. The citizens of Corydon raised $18,000 to build a new courthouse, and keep it in town. The two-story brick building with a clock tower was completed in 1890. The old courthouse was moved out of town and converted into a farmhouse. The present Modernist structure replaced it in 1964 for under $450,000. Frankhiser & Hutchens designed the building, and it was built by Grabau Construction.

The courthouse is a two-story concrete structure. The main facade is divided into four bays by concrete dividers. The main entrance is in the second bay that features a white concrete wall and a clock. The other bays are faced with dark brown brick with narrow windows. The north and south elevations are faced with white concrete. The roof is flat.

Footnotes

Government buildings completed in 1964
Modernist architecture in Iowa
County courthouses in Iowa
Buildings and structures in Wayne County, Iowa